John Lowe (1553–1586) was an English Catholic priest and martyr.

John Lowe was born the son of Simon Lowe (or Low) and Margaret Lacy of London in 1553. His father Simon was perhaps the Simon Low who was a merchant-tailor and citizen of London. He was for some time a Protestant minister. After his conversion he studied at Douai. He was a servant at Anchin Abbey for 1578–1579. He entered the English College, Rome, arriving on 19 November 1581, and was ordained a deacon there on 19 August 1582, but there is no record of where and when he was ordained a priest. Leaving Rome in September 1583, he was recorded as leaving Rheims for the mission in England on 20 December 1583. Records show that his absence abroad had been noted by the English government.

By this time his father had died, and his mother Margaret was living on London Bridge. Walking with her one evening nearby in May 1586, he talked too unguardedly about his aspirations to martyrdom and was overheard and denounced to the authorities. He was immediately arrested. It is recorded that he was taken to the Clink in London on the 11 May of that year. He was executed by hanging, drawing and quartering at Tyburn on 8 October 1586. He was executed along with two fellow priests, John Adams and Robert Dibdale.

All three priests were beatified (the last stage prior to canonisation) by Pope John Paul II on 22 November 1987.

Members of the Lowe family maintained their loyalty to the Roman Catholic Church, refusing to take the Oath of Supremacy, losing privileges, titles and land to remain loyal to the Roman Catholic faith.

See also
 Catholic Church in the United Kingdom
 Douai Martyrs

References

Sources
The most reliable compact source is Godfrey Anstruther, Seminary Priests, St Edmund's College, Ware, vol. 1, 1968, pp. 214–215.

1553 births
1586 deaths
English beatified people
Martyred Roman Catholic priests
16th-century English Roman Catholic priests
People executed under Elizabeth I by hanging, drawing and quartering
16th-century Roman Catholic martyrs
16th-century venerated Christians
Executed people from London
People executed at Tyburn
Eighty-five martyrs of England and Wales